Petre Cişmigu (12 June 1915 – 2006) was a Romanian sports shooter. He competed in the 50 m rifle, prone event at the 1952 Summer Olympics.

References

External links
 

1915 births
2006 deaths
Romanian male sport shooters
Olympic shooters of Romania
Shooters at the 1952 Summer Olympics
People from Bolhrad